The Swiss Study Foundation (German "Schweizerische Studienstiftung", French "Fondation suisse d'études") is a foundation that promotes outstanding students (top 0.3%) during their undergraduate and postgraduate studies. Requirements for admission are outstanding intellectual interests and capabilities, creativity, and character.

The Swiss Study Foundation was founded 1991 in analogy to the Studienstiftung des deutschen Volkes, its German equivalent. Currently, about 750 students are in the programme.

Notable alumni
 Caroline Jaden Stussi, actress
 Balthasar Glättli, politician
 Daniel Hellmann, performance artist
 Oliver Schmitt, historian

See also
 Studienstiftung des deutschen Volkes
 National Merit Scholarship Program

External links
 http://www.studienstiftung.ch

Education in Switzerland
Scholarships